The Riviera del Brenta is an area of the Metropolitan City of Venice of particular tourist-cultural interest due to the great architectural heritage of the Venetian villas built between the 15th and 18th centuries by the nobles of the Venetian Republic along the river Brenta (now Naviglio del Brenta).

This territory is the natural way of communication (by land or by river) of two large cities, Padua and Venice, and then over the centuries has become the holiday resort of wealthy patrons coming from the two capitals.

Driving along the Brenta Canal starting from Padua, the cities that are part of the Brenta Riviera are Stra, Fiesso d'Artico, Dolo, Mira, Oriago, Malcontenta and Fusina.

The "Naviglio" is navigable by riverboats, whose best example is the famous burchiello, which once used to carry Venetian noblemen from Venice to the countryside and Padua, and which is now a tourist attraction.

On the territory of the Riviera del Brenta, in addition to the Venetian villas, the panoramic views along the Naviglio del Brenta, or the magnificent small villages that make up the historic centers of the Riviera itself, other attractions have arisen over the last century; for example, one of the most important centers for the development, design, and production of high fashion footwear was founded and developed.

Along the main road that runs along the Riviera del Brenta, the famous Venice Marathon takes place once a year, in the month of October. The event takes place at the traditional distance of 42.195 km and starts from Stra (in front of the magnificent Villa Pisani) to end in the historic center of Venice.

History of the Venetian villas 

From 15th to 18th century many Venetian aristocratic families built their villas here (like Villa Pisani, Stra, Villa Ferretti-Angeli in Dolo, Villa Widmann-Foscari in Mira, and Villa Foscari (also known as La Malcontenta) in Malcontenta). They are known as ville venete (Venetian villas).

Noblemen used to re-invest their trade profit in big agricultural estates, which were not just countryside manors, but real, self-sustainable production complexes; they were surrounded by fields and had agricultural annexes. The villa was the name of this kind of complex, but today it refers to the manors only. Some of them have also beautiful gardens, with small woods, fountains, mazes, and small lakes. The villa Veneta is typical of all the regions of Veneto, but the Riviera del Brenta is home to some of the most beautiful and famous ones, even if there are other exceptional examples of villas such as Villa Contarini, Villa Capra "La Rotonda" or Villa Barbarigo). Many of the villas are in the Palladian style, and a few were designed by Andrea Palladio himself or by his pupil Vincenzo Scamozzi.

Venetian villas 

Here you may find the main villas, and the municipality which they belong to.

Mira 

 Villa Alessandri
 Villa Allegri von Ghega, Oriago
 Villa Bon
 Villa Foscari, Malcontenta 
 Villa Gradenigo, Oriago
 Palazzo Moro, Oriago 
 Villa Priuli, Oriago
 Villa Querini Stampalia, Mira Porte 
 Barchesse di villa Valmarana, Mira Porte 
 Villa Venier
 Villa Levi Morenos
 Villa Widmann

Dolo 

 Villa Badoer Fattoretto
 Villa Ferretti Angeli
 Villa Gasparini

Fiesso d'Artico 

 Villa Recanati-Zuccon (first half of 18th century)
 Villa Soranzo (16th century)
 Villa Barbarigo-Fontana (first built in 16th century, arranged in 18th century)
 Villa Corner-Vendramin (18th century)
 Villa Contarini di S. Basegio (built between 17th century and 18th century)
 Villa Marchese De Seynos o degli Armeni (17th century)
 Casa Venier-Tiepolo (18th century)

Stra 

 Villa Foscarini Rossi
 Villa Pisani, Stra
 Villa Pisani (San Pietro di Stra)

Vigonovo 

 Villa Sagredo

See also 
 Fiesso d'Artico
 Luigi Voltan

Coasts of Italy